Gabriel Mekler (2 December 1942 – 4 September 1977) was an American songwriter, musician, and record producer who attained fame in the 1960s, helming albums for Steppenwolf, Three Dog Night, and Janis Joplin. He also collaborated with R&B singer Etta James for two critically acclaimed albums in the early 1970s, mixing blues, soul, and then topped it off with Genya Ravan production jazz and rock.

Career
Born in Palestine, Mekler was a classically trained pianist.  Upon arriving in Los Angeles, California, Mekler sought out Dunhill Records and was hired as a staff producer, despite his lack of production experience or familiarity with rock and roll and pop music.  His first project at Dunhill was with folk-pop band The Lamp of Childhood, where he oversaw studio sessions, contributed songs and played piano. The group's three singles flopped but Mekler's next project, Steppenwolf, made music history. It was Mekler who suggested the name "Steppenwolf" to the band's members, having just read the Hermann Hesse novel. As the producer on Steppenwolf, the 1968 debut by that group, Mekler helped craft the sonic onslaught that would unleash the term "heavy metal" upon the world, a line from the brother of drummer, Jerry Edmonton (real name McCrohan), in the song, "Born to Be Wild".

The mysterious Mars Bonfire was Dennis Edmonton (McCrohan), lead guitarist for Jack London & The Sparrows.  The Oshawa, Ontario group was the beginnings of Steppenwolf and producer Mekler's contributions on psychedelic tracks such as "Born to Be Wild" and "Magic Carpet Ride".  A year after the Steppenwolf recordings, Mekler launched hits from Three Dog Night such as "One", "Try a Little Tenderness", "Eli's Coming", "Easy to Be Hard", and "Celebrate".  Other studio credits include keyboard work with Cher, Donovan and David Clayton-Thomas as well as producing songs for Dinah Washington.

He married Dorothy J. Scully on 2 August 1967 in Los Angeles, CA, and they divorced in November, 1974 in Los Angeles, CA. Mekler was Jewish.

In 1971, Mekler founded his own labels, Vulture and Lizard Records, based on Sunset Boulevard in Los Angeles.  Artists signed to Lizard/Vulture included Nolan Porter, Clydie King, Jamul, Paul Humphrey & the Cool Aid Chemists and The Frantics.  Despite national chart success both Vulture and Lizard Records collapsed in mid 1972. Mekler remained in demand for his production talent until his death from a motorcycle accident, in September 1977.

Mekler also produced Genya Ravan's Goldie Zelkowitz album, the title utilizing her stage name from Goldie and the Gingerbreads, and her father's last name, who died during this recording.

References

1942 births
1977 deaths
Record producers from California
American male songwriters
20th-century American Jews
20th-century American musicians
20th-century American businesspeople
20th-century American male musicians